Richie Wraggs was a comic strip character in the British comic Jackpot. He appeared with his black cat, Lucky.[1]

Wraggs had similarities to IPC's 'Bumpkin Billionaires Comic Strip' and was drawn by the same artist, Mike Lacey.[2] Starting from Jackpot Comics' first issue, dated 5 May 1979,[3] he appeared weekly for almost three years until issue #140 was released on 30 January 1982. He was featured on the cover of many early issues. His character remained in the comic strip until the penultimate issue. Richie Wraggs and Lucky's last full cover appearance was on issue 67.[4] They also appeared as a small image on the left-hand side of the 1982 Summer Special, including all of the Jackpot's stars.

In the first issue, Richie was kicked out of the village school in "Little Drudgebury" by the teacher after bringing a smelly cheese into class. He left with the words, "C'mon Lucky - we'll seek our fortune in the big wide world." Often, he would be rewarded in each issue with a £5 note or a large meal. In issue 137 [5], Richie was rewarded with a £10 note for lending his candle to a man whose lock had frozen on a freezing day. The two friends spent the night in a posh hotel watching TV and keeping warm in bed under an electric blanket with hot drinks and central heating. Sometimes Richie or Lucky did find jobs. In issue 138,[6] he applied for a job as an odd-job at a theatre; however, he walked onto the stage during a pantomime performance and did not get the job. They did reward him for getting the biggest laugh of the season and a cheer from the audience. He had enough for a meal and fish for Lucky at Restaurant de Posh. In issue 140, Richie and Lucky hid in an old barn with some cows to shelter from the rain.

The success of Richie's longevity was the readers' votes for 'Top Ten comic strips,' where his character was voted 4th top strip by the readers in issue 11 [7] and 9th most popular strip by the readers in issue 19.[8] Richie continued to be consistently voted as a top comic strip. He was voted 9th most popular strip by the readers in issue 96,[9] 10th most popular strip by the readers in issue 116,[10] and 5th most popular strip by the readers in issue 124.[11] Finally, in the last printed Jackpot readers' top ten, he was voted 8th most popular in issue 134.[12] Richie's character even made it to the merged issue with Buster, which was unusual for a popular comic strip character. At this time, artists Mike Lacey was already drawing the even more famous 'X-Ray Specs' (always in the top three strips as voted by readers).[13] The other nine characters voted in issue 134, also all went on to the merged issue. Other top characters from Jackpot Comic were Milly O' Naire, Penny Less, and Jack Pott.[14]

Richie was featured in some Jackpot Annuals and the 1981 and 1982 "Jackpot Summer Specials." Mike Lacey[15] drew two brand-new comic strips in the 1982 Jackpot Special.[16] These were printed after the merger with Buster comic. In the first story, Lucky hurts his paw on a diamond ring, and upon its return, the happy owner gives Richie a £20 note. The second and last new story showed Richie and Lucky sheltering under a Café umbrella and receiving an uneaten meal left behind by an extensive coach tour that had to leave quickly. Richie's last words were, "Well, Lucky, are you going to apologize?" Lucky replied, "Mumble... chew... certainly... when my mouth's empty!"

References

Fleetway and IPC Comics titles